The X chromosome is one of the two sex chromosomes in many organisms, including mammals, and is found in both males and females. It is a part of the XY sex-determination system and XO sex-determination system. The X chromosome was named for its unique properties by early researchers, which resulted in the naming of its counterpart Y chromosome, for the next letter in the alphabet, following its subsequent discovery.

Discovery

It was first noted that the X chromosome was special in 1890 by Hermann Henking in Leipzig. Henking was studying the testicles of Pyrrhocoris and noticed that one chromosome did not take part in meiosis. Chromosomes are so named because of their ability to take up staining (chroma in Greek means color). Although the X chromosome could be stained just as well as the others, Henking was unsure whether it was a different class of object and consequently named it X element, which later became X chromosome after it was established that it was indeed a chromosome.<ref>David Bainbridge, 'The X in Sex: How the X Chromosome Controls Our Lives, pages 3-5, Harvard University Press, 2003 .</ref>

The idea that the X chromosome was named after its similarity to the letter "X" is mistaken. All chromosomes normally appear as an amorphous blob under the microscope and take on a well defined shape only during mitosis. This shape is vaguely X-shaped for all chromosomes. It is entirely coincidental that the Y chromosome, during mitosis, has two very short branches which can look merged under the microscope and appear as the descender of a Y-shape.

It was first suggested that the X chromosome was involved in sex determination by Clarence Erwin McClung in 1901. After comparing his work on locusts with Henking's and others, McClung noted that only half the sperm received an X chromosome. He called this chromosome an accessory chromosome, and insisted (correctly) that it was a proper chromosome, and theorized (incorrectly)  that it was the male-determining chromosome.

Inheritance pattern

Luke Hutchison noticed that a number of possible ancestors on the X chromosome inheritance line at a given ancestral generation follows the Fibonacci sequence. A male individual has an X chromosome, which he received from his mother, and a Y chromosome, which he received from his father. The male counts as the "origin" of his own X chromosome, and at his parents' generation, his X chromosome came from a single parent. The male's mother received one X chromosome from her mother (the son's maternal grandmother), and one from her father (the son's maternal grandfather), so two grandparents contributed to the male descendant's X chromosome. The maternal grandfather received his X chromosome from his mother, and the maternal grandmother received X chromosomes from both of her parents, so three great-grandparents contributed to the male descendant's X chromosome. Five great-great-grandparents contributed to the male descendant's X chromosome, etc. (Note that this assumes that all ancestors of a given descendant are independent, but if any genealogy is traced far enough back in time, ancestors begin to appear on multiple lines of the genealogy, until eventually, a population founder appears on all lines of the genealogy.)

Humans
Function

The X chromosome in humans spans more than 153 million base pairs (the building material of DNA). It represents about 800 protein-coding genes compared to the Y chromosome containing about 70 genes, out of 20,000–25,000 total genes in the human genome.
Each person usually has one pair of sex chromosomes in each cell. Females typically have two X chromosomes, whereas males typically have one X and one Y chromosome. Both males and females retain one of their mother's X chromosomes, and females retain their second X chromosome from their father. Since the father retains his X chromosome from his mother, a human female has one X chromosome from her paternal grandmother (father's side), and one X chromosome from her mother. This inheritance pattern follows the Fibonacci numbers at a given ancestral depth.

Genetic disorders that are due to mutations in genes on the X chromosome are described as X linked. If the X chromosome has a genetic disease gene, it always causes illness in male patients, since men have only one X chromosome and therefore only one copy of each gene. Females, instead, may stay healthy and only be carrier of genetic illness, since they have another X chromosome and possibility to have healthy gene copy. For example, hemophilia and red-green colorblindness run in family this way.

The X chromosome carries hundreds of genes but few, if any, of these have anything to do directly with sex determination. Early in embryonic development in females, one of the two X chromosomes is permanently inactivated in nearly all somatic cells (cells other than egg and sperm cells). This phenomenon is called X-inactivation or Lyonization, and creates a Barr body. If X-inactivation in the somatic cell meant a complete de-functionalizing of one of the X-chromosomes, it would ensure that females, like males, had only one functional copy of the X chromosome in each somatic cell. This was previously assumed to be the case. However, recent research suggests that the Barr body may be more biologically active than was previously supposed.

The partial inactivation of the X-chromosome is due to repressive heterochromatin that compacts the DNA and prevents the expression of most genes.  Heterochromatin compaction is regulated by Polycomb Repressive Complex 2 (PRC2).

Genes
 Number of genes 
The following are some of the gene count estimates of human X chromosome. Because researchers use different approaches to genome annotation their predictions of the number of genes on each chromosome varies (for technical details, see gene prediction). Among various projects, the collaborative consensus coding sequence project (CCDS) takes an extremely conservative strategy. So CCDS's gene number prediction represents a lower bound on the total number of human protein-coding genes.

 Gene list 

The following is a partial list of genes on human chromosome X. For complete list, see the link in the infobox on the right.

Structure

It is theorized by Ross et al. 2005 and Ohno 1967 that the X chromosome is at least partially derived from the autosomal (non-sex-related) genome of other mammals, evidenced from interspecies genomic sequence alignments.

The X chromosome is notably larger and has a more active euchromatin region than its Y chromosome counterpart. Further comparison of the X and Y reveal regions of homology between the two. However, the corresponding region in the Y appears far shorter and lacks regions that are conserved in the X throughout primate species, implying a genetic degeneration for Y in that region. Because males have only one X chromosome, they are more likely to have an X chromosome-related disease.

It is estimated that about 10% of the genes encoded by the X chromosome are associated with a family of "CT" genes, so named because they encode for markers found in both tumor cells (in cancer patients) as well as in the human testis (in healthy patients).

Role in disease
Numerical abnormalities
Klinefelter syndrome:
 Klinefelter syndrome is caused by the presence of one or more extra copies of the X chromosome in a male's cells.
 Males with Klinefelter syndrome typically have one extra copy of the X chromosome in each cell, for a total of two X chromosomes and one Y chromosome (47,XXY). It is less common for affected males to have two or three extra X chromosomes (48,XXXY or 49,XXXXY) or extra copies of both the X and Y chromosomes (48,XXYY) in each cell. The extra genetic material may lead to tall stature, learning and reading disabilities, and other medical problems. Each extra X chromosome lowers the child's IQ by about 15 points, which means that the average IQ in Klinefelter syndrome is in general in the normal range, although below average. When additional X and/or Y chromosomes are present in 48,XXXY, 48,XXYY, or 49,XXXXY, developmental delays and cognitive difficulties can be more severe and mild intellectual disability may be present.
 Klinefelter syndrome can also result from an extra X chromosome in only some of the body's cells. These cases are called mosaic 46,XY/47,XXY.

Triple X syndrome (also called 47,XXX or trisomy X):
 This syndrome results from an extra copy of the X chromosome in each of a female's cells. Females with trisomy X have three X chromosomes, for a total of 47 chromosomes per cell. The average IQ of females with this syndrome is 90, while the average IQ of unaffected siblings is 100. Their stature on average is taller than normal females. They are fertile and their children do not inherit the condition.
 Females with more than one extra copy of the X chromosome (48, XXXX syndrome or 49, XXXXX syndrome) have been identified, but these conditions are rare.

Turner syndrome:
 This results when each of a female's cells has one normal X chromosome and the other sex chromosome is missing or altered. The missing genetic material affects development and causes the features of the condition, including short stature and infertility.
 About half of individuals with Turner syndrome have monosomy X (45,X), which means each cell in a woman's body has only one copy of the X chromosome instead of the usual two copies. Turner syndrome can also occur if one of the sex chromosomes is partially missing or rearranged rather than completely missing. Some women with Turner syndrome have a chromosomal change in only some of their cells. These cases are called Turner syndrome mosaics (45,X/46,XX).

 X-linked recessive disorders 
Sex linkage was first discovered in insects, e.g., T. H. Morgan's 1910 discovery of the pattern of inheritance of  the white eyes mutation in Drosophila melanogaster.  Such discoveries helped to explain x-linked disorders in humans, e.g., haemophilia A and B, adrenoleukodystrophy, and red-green color blindness.

Other disorders

XX male syndrome is a rare disorder, where the SRY region of the Y chromosome has recombined to be located on one of the X chromosomes. As a result, the XX combination after fertilization has the same effect as a XY combination, resulting in a male. However, the other genes of the X chromosome cause feminization as well.

X-linked endothelial corneal dystrophy is an extremely rare disease of cornea associated with Xq25 region. Lisch epithelial corneal dystrophy is associated with Xp22.3.

Megalocornea 1 is associated with Xq21.3-q22

Adrenoleukodystrophy, a rare and fatal disorder that is carried by the mother on the x-cell. It affects only boys between the ages of 5 and 10 and destroys the protective cell surrounding the nerves, myelin, in the brain. The female carrier hardly shows any symptoms because females have a copy of the x-cell. This disorder causes a once healthy boy to lose all abilities to walk, talk, see, hear, and even swallow. Within 2 years after diagnosis, most boys with Adrenoleukodystrophy die.

Cytogenetic band

Research
In March 2020 researchers reported that their review supports the unguarded X hypothesis: according to this hypothesis one reason for why the average lifespan of males is not as long as that of females – by 18% on average according to the study – is that they have a Y chromosome which cannot protect an individual from harmful genes expressed on the X chromosome, while a duplicate X chromosome, as present in female organisms, can ensure harmful genes are not expressed.

In July 2020 scientists reported the first complete and gap-less assembly of a human X chromosome.

See also
 List of X-STR markers
 Sex linkage
 X-inactivation
 Pseudoautosomal region
 Y chromosome

References
 Earlier versions of this article contain material from the National Library of Medicine, a part of the National Institutes of Health (USA,) which, as a US government publication, is in the public domain.''

External links

 
 

Chromosomes
Chromosome X
Cytogenetics
Sex-determination systems
Sexual dimorphism